Väinö Penttala (16 January 1897 – 28 February 1976) was a Finnish wrestler and Olympic medalist. He won a silver medal in freestyle wrestling at the 1920 Summer Olympics in Antwerp. In 1923 the first freestyle wrestling tournaments took place in Finland. Penttala won the title four times (until 1927).,

References

1897 births
1976 deaths
Olympic wrestlers of Finland
Wrestlers at the 1920 Summer Olympics
Finnish male sport wrestlers
Olympic silver medalists for Finland
Olympic medalists in wrestling
Medalists at the 1920 Summer Olympics
19th-century Finnish people
20th-century Finnish people